116 U-boats were scuttled or otherwise sunk in 1945 and 1946 in Operation Deadlight. They had been surrendered by the Kriegsmarine to allied forces at the end of the Second World War. They were sunk by a variety of air attacks, torpedoes and naval gunfire in locations off the Irish and Scottish coasts, while a number sank while under tow.

Table of Operation Deadlight U-boats

Note: 116 U-boats were involved in Operation Deadlight (counting U-760).

References
Notes

Operation Deadlight
U-boats scuttled in 1945
U-boats scuttled in 1946
U-boats